Phyllostomus is a genus of leaf-nosed bat. It contains four described species.

Species
Genus Phyllostomus - spear-nosed bats
Pale spear-nosed bat, Phyllostomus discolor
Lesser spear-nosed bat, Phyllostomus elongatus
Greater spear-nosed bat, Phyllostomus hastatus
Guianan spear-nosed bat, Phyllostomus latifolius

References

Phyllostomidae
Bat genera
Taxa named by Bernard Germain de Lacépède